Oracle StorageTek SL8500 is an enterprise-class robotic tape library.

Each library module starts with a capacity of 1448 tape cartridges, and expands in 1728 cartridge increments to a maximum capacity of 10088.  It supports up to 64 tape drives and 4 or 8 independent robots in each library.  Each tape drive installed in the SL8500 library has an independent data path.  The aggregate data rate for all drives reaches 58 TB/hour per module using T10000D drives, more with compression.

Up to ten such modules can be connected side-by-side and automatically pass tapes between each other, forming a complex capable of storing over 925 PB of data and mounting 640 tape drives.

References

External links 

 Sun StorageTek SL8500 Product Tour (1 of 2)
 Sun StorageTek SL8500 Product Tour (2 of 2)

Sun Microsystems hardware